Issa Bagayogo (1961 – 10 October 2016) was a Malian musician. He released four full-length albums all under the record label Six Degrees Records. Bagayogo lent his voice and played the kamele n'goni (a six-stringed West African instrument similar to a banjo) while Yves Wernert was the producer and keyboardist. Bagayogo died after a long illness on 10 October 2016.

Career
Bagayogo blended his native Malian traditions with western pop music and drew comparisons to some of the great Malian musicians such as Ali Farka Touré and Toumani Diabaté. 

Sya, originally released in 1998, was the first album released under Six Degrees Records. The second album is titled Timbuktu, after the  ancient city in Mali. The album covers issues such as racial tolerance, regional pride, and drug abuse among youths. Bagayogo continued his fusion of his native African style music with electronic beats on this album.

In 2004, Bagayogo released his album called Tassoumakan, which means "voice of fire", followed by Mali Koura in 2008.

Discography
 Sya (1999) Six Degrees Records
 Timbuktu (2002) Six Degrees Records
 Tassoumakan (2004) Six Degrees Records
 Mali Koura (2008) Six Degrees Records

References

External links
 Six Degrees Records Website

1961 births
2016 deaths
20th-century Malian male singers
Wrasse Records artists
Six Degrees Records artists
21st-century Malian male singers